The Geometry A is a battery-powered compact sedan produced by Chinese auto manufacturer Geely under the Geometry brand.

Overview

The Geometry A is the first model of the Geometry brand. It was developed based on the Geely Emgrand GL sedan.

Powertrain
The Geometry A comes in a choice of two battery capacities, a 51.9 kWh and a longer-range 61.9 kWh version with a range of 500 km (310 miles) on a single charge.

Geometry A Pro
As of February 2021, teasers of the facelift of the Geometry A was revealed. The battery density of the Geometry A Pro is 183.23Wh/kg and the NEDC range is

Geometry G6
The Geometry G6 is the facelifted variant of the Geometry A launched in September 2022. The G6 features restyled front and rear end designs as well as the Harmony OS operating system by Huawei. The power comes from a 150kW electric motor with two variants offering a 480km and 620km electric range respectively.

References

External links
 Geometry Official Website

Mid-size cars
Front-wheel-drive vehicles
Sedans
Cars introduced in 2019
2010s cars
Electric concept cars
Cars of China
Production electric cars